Tangchi is a town in Tailai County, western Heilongjiang province, Northeast China, about  south-southwest of the prefecture city Qiqihar.

It was the site of a battle in the Jiangqiao Campaign on November 17, 1931 between Ma Zhanshan's 23,000 Chinese and 3,500 Japanese under Lt. General Jiro Tamon during the invasion of Manchuria.

Township-level divisions of Heilongjiang